Karan Sharma (born 2 November 1996) is an Indian cricketer. He made his List A debut for Railways in the 2018–19 Vijay Hazare Trophy on 20 September 2018.

References

External links
 

1996 births
Living people
Indian cricketers
Railways cricketers
Place of birth missing (living people)